Shivram Dattatreya Phadnis (Devanagari:शिवराम दत्तात्रेय फडणीस), known as S. D. Phadnis (Devanagari:शि. द. फडणीस) (born 29 July 1925) is a cartoonist and illustrator from India.

Biography

Born in Bhoj, Belgaum, India, Phandis took his formal art education at Sir J.J. Institute of Applied Art, Mumbai. He designed the cover of the Diwali special issue of the Marathi magazine Mohini every year since 1952. He was awarded a Lifetime Achievement Award by the Indian Institute of Cartoonists in June 2001. A number his cartoons have been exhibited and published by the Montreal International Salon of Cartoons. He was invitee participant in 'Cartoons from India' exhibition at Frankfurt Book Fair. He is married to Shakuntala and has two daughters. He lives in Pune.

Authorship 
 Painting for Children 1 (Paperback) 
 Painting for Children 2 (Paperback) 
 Laughing Gallery (Paperback) 
 Miskil Gallery-Collection of New Cartoons, Some with Marathi Titles (मिश्किल गॅलरी)
 Reshatan (Marathi)

Works and highlights 

 1951: First humorous cover on Huns magazine
 1952: First humorous cover on a Diwali Special issue of Mohini.
 1954: Receives Outstanding Editorial Art Award by Commercial Artist's Guild (CAG), Mumbai.
 1965: First exhibition of coloured originals, Jehangir Art Gallery, Mumbai.
 1966: Laughing Gallery held in New Delhi. Inaugurated by former Indian President Zakir Hussein. 
 1970: First book of select cartoons, Laughing Gallery published.
 1987: University Grants Commission (UGC) broadcasts S D Phadnis' programmes on National Television.
 1997: Chitrahas and Laughing Gallery tours the US and the UK.
 2000: Su. La. Gadre Matoshri Puraskar, Mumbai.
 2000: Marmik Puraskar, Mumbai.
 2000: Ravi Paranjape Foundation Award, Pune.
 2001: Lifetime Achievement Award, by Indian Institute of Cartoonists, Bangalore.
 2006: Invitee participant in 'Cartoons from India' exhibition at Frankfurt World Book Fair.
 2011: Interview (with pictures) on TV channel IBN Lokmat, in "Great Bhet" series.
 2011: First Huns Puraskar by Huns Publications.
 2011: "Jeevan Gaurav Puraskar" by International Logevity Centre, India.
 2012: "Maharashtra Sahitya Parishad Puraskar" for the book 'Reshatan' written by S D Phadnis.

References

External links 
 Cartoons by S D Phadnis
 Official Website of S D Phadnis
 Website of Indiaart Gallery
 Marathi Book by Vasant Sarwate that contains an essay on the art of S D Phadnis and a few of his cartoons सहप्रवासी (Sahapravasi)

1925 births
Living people
Indian cartoonists
Marathi people
People from Belagavi district
Writers from Karnataka

Artists from Maharashtra